New London School may refer to:
New London High School (Connecticut) in New London, Connecticut
New London High School (Ohio) in New London, Ohio
New London High School (Wisconsin) in New London, Wisconsin
New London School in Texas (K–11), site of the 1937 New London School explosion